The Guntur–Tenali section connects  and  of Guntur district in the Indian state of Andhra Pradesh. The section is an electrified double-track railway, with the second line opened on 26 April 2019.

History 
Guntur–Tenali section, a part of Guntur–Repalle broad gauge project was opened in 1916, which was then owned by Madras and Southern Mahratta Railway.

Jurisdiction 

References 

Rail transport in Andhra Pradesh

1916 establishments in India
5 ft 6 in gauge railways in India
Railway lines opened in 1916